Manuel Pérez Clemente (better known as Sanjulián; born 24 June 1941) is a Spanish painter, most notable for his magazine and novel covers. He was born in Barcelona, and studied at Belles Arts of Sant Jordi.

Sanjulián began working for Selecciones Ilustradas circa 1962, and Warren Publishing in 1970.

He has had multiple shows at The Society of Illustrators in New York City, and was a guest at the 2008 Emerald City ComiCon.

Work
Magazine and comic covers:
 Atomika - Sketchbook 2009
 1984
 Creepy (1964) - #42, 46, 47, 48, 50, 51, 61, 79
 Creepy (2009) - #5
 Eerie - #40, 41, 46, 48, 50–54, 58, 62, 63, 66, 67, 69, 70–72, 76, 102, 133, 135
 Gespenster Geschichten - #1168
 Heavy Metal - #71, Special 1984, Special Vol.12
 Realms of Fantasy - October 1996, June 1997
 Vampirella - #12–16, 23, 36–38, 44, 45, 50, 51, 55, 81, 91, 99, 100, 102, 107, 109
 Vampirella: Crimson Chronicles - #1
 Warren Presents - #1, 6, 13

Novel covers:
 The Artificial Man (1967)
 Bloodstalk (1975)
 Deadwalk (1976)
 Conan and the Sorcerer (1978 & 1984)
 The Blade of Conan (1979)
 The Treasure of Tranicos (1980)
 Conan the Mercenary (1981)
 The Flame Knife (1981)
 Zarsthor's Bane (1978)
 The Lost Continent (1979)
 The Gods of Bal-Sagoth (1979)
 Slaves of Sleep (1979)
 Three-Bladed Doom (1979)
 Tigers of the Sea (1979)
 Worms of the Earth (1979)
 Anackire (1983)
 The Year's Best Fantasy Stories: 9 (1983)
 The Name of the Rose (1984)
 Dinosaur Tales (1984)
 The Vizier's Second Daughter (1985)
 The Dragon Waiting (1985)
 The Green Pearl (1986 & 1987)
 Madouc (1990)
 Janissaries III: Storms of Victory (1987 & 1988)
 Fletch, Too (1988)
 The Storm Lord (1988)
 The White Serpent (1988)
 The Warriors of Spider (1988)
 The Way of Spider (1989)
 The Web of Spider (1989)
 Crusader's Torch (1989)
 A Candle for D'Artagnan (1989)
 The Lions of Tsavo (1989)
 The Artifact (1990)
 An Abyss of Light (1990)
 Treasure of Light (1990)
 Redemption of Light (1991)
 The Empire of Fear (1990)
 Scavenger Hunt (1990)
 Starstrike (1990)
 Rally Cry! (1990)
 Terrible Swift Sword (1998)
 The Unicorn Solution (1991)
 Fire Crossing (1991)
 Requiem for the Conqueror (1991)
 Relic of Empire (1992)
 Mistworld (1992)
 Ghostworld (1993)
 Hellworld (1993)
 The Last Dancer (1993)
 Dragon Reforged (1995)
 Dragons Can Only Rust (1995)
 The Great and Secret Show (1995)
 Her Majesty's Wizard (1995)
 Devil's Tower (1996)
 Palace (1996)
 The Eyes of God (1998)
 Tarzan Triumphant/Tarzan and the City of Gold (1997)
 See You Later (1998)
 Imperium Without End (1999)
 Imperium Afire (2000)
 Devlin's Luck (2002)
 Devlin's Honor (2003)
 Devlin's Justice (2004)

Other work:
 Sanjulian: Master Visionary (2001) 
 Sword's Edge: Paintings Inspired by the Works of Robert E. Howard (2010) 
 Conan: Adventures in an Age Undreamed Of (2016, Modiphius Entertainment, inner pages illustrations by Sanjulián, among others)
 Dungeon Crawl Classics 7th printing Goodman Games, special edition cover.

Sources

 Sanjulian at the Comic Book Database
 Sanjulian at Amazon.com

External links
 Official website

1941 births
Painters from Barcelona
20th-century Spanish painters
20th-century Spanish male artists
Spanish male painters
21st-century Spanish painters
Living people
21st-century Spanish male artists